Zaqueu "Zak" Morioka (born November 6, 1978) is a racecar driver from São Paulo, Brazil.  He won the USAC Formula Ford 2000 Championship in 1997.  In 2000, he competed in 1 Indy Racing League contest for Revista Motors/Tri Star Motorsports. He finished in 15th position in the race.

IRL IndyCar Series

References

External links
Driver DB Profile
http://www.motorsport.com/openwheel/news/na-f2000-morioka-honored/
 http://www.oldracingcars.com/driver/Zak_Morioka

1978 births
IndyCar Series drivers
Living people
Brazilian racing drivers
U.S. F2000 National Championship drivers
Brazilian IndyCar Series drivers
Brazilian people of Japanese descent